In the mathematical theory of dynamical systems, an irrational rotation is a map
 
where  is an irrational number. Since  is irrational, the rotation has infinite order in the circle group and the map  has no periodic orbits.

Alternatively, we can use multiplicative notation for an irrational rotation by introducing the map
 

The relationship between the additive and multiplicative notations is the group isomorphism
.

It can be shown that  is an isometry.

There is a strong distinction in circle rotations that depends on whether  is rational or irrational. It can also be shown that 
 when .

Significance 
Irrational rotations form a fundamental example in the theory of dynamical systems. An irrational rotation is a measure-preserving ergodic transformation, but it is not mixing. C*-algebras associated with irrational rotations, known as irrational rotation algebras, have been extensively studied.

Properties 
Therefore, irrational rotations are topologically transitive.
 Irrational (and rational) rotations are not topologically mixing.
 Irrational rotations are uniquely ergodic, with the Lebesgue measure serving as the unique invariant probability measure.
 Suppose . Since  is ergodic,.

Generalizations
 Circle rotations are examples of group translations.
 The circle rotation can be thought of as a subdivision of a circle into two parts, which are then exchanged with each other. A subdivision into more than two parts, which are then permuted with one-another, is called an interval exchange transformation.
 Rigid rotations of compact groups effectively behave like circle rotations; the invariant measure is the Haar measure.

Applications
 Skew Products over Rotations of the Circle: In 1969 William A. Veech constructed examples of minimal and not uniquely ergodic dynamical systems as follows: "Take two copies of the unit circle and mark off segment  of length  in the counterclockwise direction on each one with endpoint at 0. Now take  irrational and consider the following dynamical system. Start with a point , say in the first circle. Veech showed that if  is irrational, then there exists irrational  for which this system is minimal and the Lebesgue measure is not uniquely ergodic."

See also

 Bernoulli map
 Modular arithmetic
 Siegel disc
 Toeplitz algebra
 Phase locking (circle map)

References

Further reading
 C. E. Silva, Invitation to ergodic theory, Student Mathematical Library, vol 42, American Mathematical Society, 2008 

Dynamical systems
Irrational numbers